Saint-Aubin-des-Bois may refer to:
 Saint-Aubin-des-Bois, Calvados
 Saint-Aubin-des-Bois, Eure-et-Loir